Lebyazhsky District is an administrative and municipal district (raion), one of the thirty-nine in Kirov Oblast, Russia. It is located in the south of the oblast. Its administrative center is the urban locality (an urban-type settlement) of Lebyazhye. Population:  11,176 (2002 Census);  The population of Lebyazhye accounts for 38.6% of the district's total population.

References

Notes

Sources

 
Districts of Kirov Oblast